Diofebo Farnese (died 1622) was a Roman Catholic prelate who served as Titular Patriarch of Jerusalem (1621–1622).

Biography
On 17 March 1621, Diofebo Farnese was appointed during the papacy of Pope Gregory XV as Titular Patriarch of Jerusalem.
On 18 April 1621, he was consecrated bishop by Luigi Capponi, Archbishop of Ravenna, with Galeazzo Sanvitale, Archbishop Emeritus of Bari-Canosa, and Alessandro Scappi, Bishop of Satriano e Campagna, serving as co-consecrators. 
He served as Titular Patriarch of Jerusalem until his death in 1622.

Episcopal succession
While bishop, he was the principal co-consecrator of:
Cosimo de Torres, Titular Archbishop of Hadrianopolis in Haemimonto (1621); and
Giovanni Mascardi, Bishop of Nebbio (1621); and
Odoardo Farnese, Cardinal-Bishop of Sabina (1621).

References

External links and additional sources
 (for Chronology of Bishops) 
 (for Chronology of Bishops) 

17th-century Roman Catholic titular bishops
Bishops appointed by Pope Gregory XV
1622 deaths
Patriarchs of Jerusalem